Port Augusta Airport  is an airport located  west of Port Augusta, South Australia.

Overview
The airport serves as a gateway to the city of Port Augusta, as well as isolated mineral projects in the north of the state. Other operations include a base for the Royal Flying Doctor Service which maintains administrative, engineering and hangar facilities for the Pilatus PC-12 fleet at the airport. The majority of traffic at the airport are general aviation related movements, and the Port Augusta Aero Club is also located here. The airfield has previously supported charter operations using larger jets such as the Fokker 100 and British Aerospace 146 under a concession by the Civil Aviation Safety Authority, however these operations are no longer permitted due to apron constraints and jet blast clearances.

Airlines and destinations

See also
 List of airports in South Australia

References

External links
Official webpage

Airports in South Australia
Eyre Peninsula
Port Augusta